Samuel Azariah Shelton (September 3, 1858 – September 13, 1948) was a United States Representative from Missouri's 16th congressional district.

Born near Waterloo, Alabama, Shelton moved with his widowed mother to Webster County, Missouri in 1869.

Shelton was elected as a Republican to the 67th Congress (March 4, 1921 – March 3, 1923). He was not a candidate for renomination in 1922 to the 68th Congress.

References

1858 births
1948 deaths
People from Lauderdale County, Alabama
People from Marshfield, Missouri
Republican Party members of the United States House of Representatives from Missouri